Michael Cavanagh may refer to:

 Michael Cavanagh (judge) (born 1940), justice on the Michigan Supreme Court
 Michael Cavanagh (architect) (1860–1941), Australian architect
 Mike Cavanagh, drummer for King Gizzard & the Lizard Wizard

See also 
 Michael Cavanaugh (disambiguation)
 Michael Kavanagh (disambiguation)